Kudalagi is a village in the southern state of Karnataka, India. Administratively, Kodalgi is under Baichabal gram panchayat, Shorapur Taluka of Yadgir District in Karnataka.  The village of Kodalgi is 2.3 km by road north of the village of Baichbal and 15 km by road south of the village of Kembhavi. The nearest railhead is in Yadgir.

Demographics 
 census, Kodalgi had 1,916 inhabitants, with 975 males and 941 females.

Notes

Etymology
The name Kudalagi comes from two ditches are joined at this place and which are coming from Kembhavi and Karadakal. This village have lot of historical fanes
 Baba Maharaj temple
 Ramajogitemple (Koodaligeppa)
 Hanuman temple
 Gramadevate temple

External links 
 

Villages in Yadgir district